The Harriet Cohen International Music Award was founded in 1951 by Sir Arnold Bax and others, in honour of the British pianist Harriet Cohen.

It is to be distinguished from the Harriet Cohen Bach Prize, established in 1994, for the most deserving pupil at the Royal Academy of Music in the field of Bach piano playing.

Recipients

1950s 

1951
Philippe Entremont – Piano Medal

1954
Ingrid Haebler – Beethoven Medal

1955
 Donald Bell – Arnold Bax Memorial Medal, outstanding student from the Commonwealth
 Jacques Klein
 Richard Farrell – Medal for Piano
 Kenneth Schermerhorn

1956
 Rohan de Saram

1957
 Eduardo Vercelli (Buenos Aires, 1935 – Geneva, 1993)
 Mario delli Ponti – Bach Medal
 Adam Harasiewicz, for outstanding achievement in piano

1958
 Ahmed Adnan Saygun – Jean Sibelius Composition Medal
 Miguel Querol Gavalda  – Gold Medal
 Peter-Lukas Graf

1959
 Theo Bruins – Beethoven medal
 Glenn Gould – Bach Medal
İdil Biret – Dinu Lipatti gold medal
 Luis Garcia-Renart – Cello Prize

1960s 
1960
 Joaquín Achúcarro – Best Debut of the Year
 Piet Kee – Bach Medal
 Bogdan Paprocki – Opera Medal

1961
 Elliott Carter – Sibelius Medal for Composition
 Aafje Heynis – outstanding artistry
 Oscar Mischiati – A. Davison Memorial Medal for Musicology

1962
 Barbara Hesse-Bukowska – British Medal
 Byron Janis – Beethoven Medal (for best performance of two Beethoven Sonatas, the "Waldstein" and Opus 109)
Yonty Solomon –  Beethoven Medal
 Arve Tellefsen
Yaltah Menuhin / Joel Ryce
Diane Andersen – Bach Medal

1963
 Vladimir Ashkenazy – Piano Prize (shared)
 Norma Fisher – Piano Prize (shared)
 Louise Talma – Sibelius Medal for Composition
 Gloria Saarinen – Commonwealth Medal
 Francis Chagrin – Film Composer of the Year
 Anita Välkki

1964
 Bernadette Greevy
 Nelson Freire

1965
 Martin Isepp – Carroll Donner Stuchell Medal for Accompanying

1966
 Marie Collier
 Waleri Gradow (Valery Gradow)
 Ronald Stevenson – for Busoni centenary radio programme (possibly award year was 1967)

1967
 José-Luis Garcia
 François Glorieux
1968
 Roger Smalley – Contemporary music performance
 Maureen Forrester – the Council's Prize
 William Mathias – Bax Society Prize
 Fernande Kaeser – Beethoven Medal
 Fine Art Orchestra – Chamber Music Gold Medal

1990s 
1996
Roger Owens

2000s 
2001
 Ilid Jones

2002
 Cheryl Frances-Hoad (joint winner)

2005
 Victoria Davies, harpist

Dates not yet determined
Sebastian Benda – Bach Medal
Jennifer Bullock
Edwin Carr
Maria Clodes (Maria Clodes-Jaguaribe) – best young pianist of the year
Paul Max Edlin
Christopher Green-Armytage
Jerome Jelinek – cello
Fernando Laires – Beethoven Medal (in memory of Artur Schnabel)
Aase Nordmo Løvberg (Gold medal for singing)
Elizabeth Powell
Abbey Simon
Erna Spoorenberg
Koji Toyoda – Bach medal
Valerie Tryon
Elena Vorotko – Bach Prize
Ronald Woodcock

References 

Awards established in 1951
British music awards
Classical music awards